BASys (Bacterial Annotation System) is a freely available web server that can be used to perform automated, comprehensive annotation of bacterial genomes. With the advent of next generation DNA sequencing it is now possible to sequence the complete genome of a bacterium (typically ~4 million bases) within a single day.  This has led to an explosion in the number of fully sequenced microbes. In fact, as of 2013, there were more than 2700 fully sequenced bacterial genomes deposited with GenBank.  However, a continuing challenge with microbial genomics is finding the resources or tools for annotating the large number of newly sequenced genomes. BASys was developed in 2005 in anticipation of these needs. In fact, BASys was the world’s first publicly accessible microbial genome annotation web server.  Because of its widespread popularity, the BASys server was updated in 2011 through the addition of multiple server nodes to handle the large number of queries it was receiving.

The BASys server is designed to accept either assembled genome data (raw DNA sequence data) or complete proteome assignments as input.  If raw DNA sequence is provided, BASys employs Glimmer (version 2.1.3) to identify the genes. The output from BASys is a comprehensive genome-wide annotation (with ~60 annotation subfields for each gene) and a zoomable, hyperlinked genome map of the query genome. BASys uses nearly 30 different programs to determine and annotate gene/protein names, GO functions, COG functions, possible paralogues and orthologues, molecular weight, isoelectric point, operon structure, subcellular localization, signal peptides, transmembrane regions, secondary structure, 3D structure, reactions and pathways. The full list of programs used by BASys is given below:

In addition to its extensive annotation for each gene/protein in the query genome, BASys also generates colorful, clickable and fully zoomable circular maps of each input chromosome.  These bacterial genome maps are generated used a program called CGView (Circular Genome Viewer) which was developed in 2004. The genome maps are designed to allow rapid navigation and detailed visualization of all the BASys-generated gene annotations. A complete BASys run takes approximately 16 h for an average bacterial chromosome (approximately 4 Megabases). BASys annotations may be viewed and downloaded anonymously or through a password protected access system. BASys will store its bacterial genome annotations on the server for a maximum of 180 days. BASys handles approximately 1000 submissions a year. BASys is accessible at https://www.basys.ca/

Scope and Access
All data in BacMap is non-proprietary or is derived from a non-proprietary source. It is freely accessible and available to anyone. In addition, nearly every data item is fully traceable and explicitly referenced to the original source. BacMap data is available through a public web interface and downloads.

See also
Circular bacterial chromosome
Functional genomics
BacMap
Bacteria
Genome
Microbiology

References

Biological databases
Biochemistry